Facundo Bagnis was the defending champion but chose not to defend his title.

Nicolás Jarry won the title after defeating João Souza 6–1, 3–6, 7–6(7–0) in the final.

Seeds

Draw

Finals

Top half

Bottom half

References
Main Draw
Qualifying Draw

Claro Open Medellín - Singles
2017 Singles